Nick Steitz (born August 18, 1982) is a former American football / Arena football guard. He has spent time with the Washington Redskins, the New England Patriots the San Francisco 49ers, and the Grand Rapids Rampage.

References

External links
Grand Rapids Rampage bio

1982 births
Living people
People from Merced County, California
American football offensive guards
Oregon Ducks football players
Grand Rapids Rampage players
Players of American football from California